Winternitz can be a:

Place name 
 German name of Vintířov, now an "obec" (district) of Radonice.

Surname 
Winternitz is a surname of Jewish pedigree originated from Vintířov.

 Adolfo Winternitz, also Adolf Gustav Winternitz (1906–1993), Austrian-Peruvian Jewish painter
  (1893–1961), British mathematician
 Emanuel Winternitz (1898-1983) curator emeritus of the Department of Musical Instruments of the New York City Metropolitan Museum of Art; musicologist, "father of the field of musical iconography"
  (1882-1971), Austrian author, first wife of Stefan Zweig
 Helen Winternitz, contemporary writer
  (1868-1934), Austrian and German physician
  (1896-1952), Marxist politician, economist
 Judith Winternitz, Australian writer 
  (1880-1958), Austrian female singer
 Moriz Winternitz (1863-1937), Austrian Jewish indologist
 Moshe Dovid Winternitz (1855-1944), Head of the Beth din Rabbinical Court in Satmar, Hungary; killed in Auschwitz concentration camp
 Pavel Winternitz (born 1936), Czechoslovakian and Canadian mathematical physicist
  (1861–1929), German painter
 Roland Winters, born Roland Winternitz (1904-1989), American actor
 Wilhelm Winternitz, (1834–1917), Austrian balneologist

Jewish families
Czech Jews
Surnames of Czech origin

de:Winternitz